The Lo stadio Tour 2015 is a concert tour by Italian singer-songwriter Tiziano Ferro in promotion of his first compilation album, TZN - The Best of Tiziano Ferro. The news of the tour was announced in October 2014 on the official Facebook profile of the singer. In just 24 hours, 50,000 tickets were sold.

Band
 Davide Tagliapietra: Guitarist
 Luca Scarpa: Pianist
 Reggie Hamilton: Bassist
 Nicola Peruch: Keyboardist
 Tim Stewart: Guitarist
 Aaron Spears: Drummer

Setlist
"Xdono"
"La differenza tra me e te"
"Sere nere"
"Troppo buono"
"Indietro"
"E fuori è buio"
"Imbranato"
"Il regalo più grande"
"Scivoli di nuovo"
"Il sole esiste per tutti"
Encore

Encore

Encore Latina (instrumental)

Tour dates

External links
Tiziano Ferro Official Website

References

2015 concert tours
Concert tours of Europe
Tiziano Ferro